(meaning "resonance" or "echo") is a premium blended whisky produced in Japan by Beam Suntory (a subsidiary of Suntory Beverage & Food Ltd, which itself is a subsidiary of Suntory Holdings of Osaka, Japan). It has won several awards.

History
Hibiki was introduced in 1989 by Suntory, originally with expressions having age statements of 17 and 21 years. (In the convention for whisky age statements, the age stated is the age of the youngest whisky in the blend.) A 30-year expression was introduced in 1997, and a 12-year expression was introduced in 2009.

In 2014, the brand was moved into an American-headquartered subsidiary called Beam Suntory when the subsidiary was created following the company's purchase of Beam Inc., the producer of the world renowned bourbon whiskey Jim Beam.

A new expression called "Japanese Harmony", with no age statement, was introduced in 2015. The new blend was said to use the same malt and grain whiskies used in the first Hibiki blend, being a blend of at least 10 malt and grain whiskies from three distilleries, aged in five different cask types, with some elements aged up to approximately 20 years.

As of October 2017, the brand was available in three variations (and the blends with age statements of 12 and 30 years were no longer listed on the company website):
 Hibiki 17 and 21 years old
 Hibiki Japanese Harmony (no age statement)

In May 2018, reports started coming out indicating the discontinuation of the Hibiki 17 expression. However, as of July 2019, the Hibiki 17 expression remained on the company website.

Blends
For producing the blends available as of 2010, more than 30 whiskies were used in the mix, including some that were aged more than 30 years and some that were aged in old umeshu casks. A bamboo charcoal filtering step has also been used. The company said the process "Gives it a very sweet and gentle flavor". In 2015, it was reported that at least 10 malt and grain whiskies were used from three distilleries (Yamazaki, Hakushu, and Chita), aged in five different cask types, with some elements aged up to approximately 20 years or longer. Three brand expressions are currently available .

References

Japanese whisky
Suntory